The Mass No. 3 in B-flat major,  324, is a mass composed by Franz Schubert in 1815. It is written for four soloists, a four-part choir and orchestra. While by length it could be a missa brevis, its large orchestral force with trumpets, timpani and woodwinds has also led to its classification as a missa solemnis.

Background 
Schubert composed this mass setting a few months after his mass in G major, beginning on 11 November 1815. The occasion for which it was composed is unknown; however, it is thought that the soprano soloist in the first performance was Therese Grob. This suggests that it was written for the Lichtental Parish Church; Schubert may also have been attempting to create opportunities to spend time with Grob, with whom he was deeply in love.

Its large orchestral component and extended orchestral interludes have been called "Haydnesque"; the latter's Nelson Mass has been cited as a particularly strong influence. References to Mozart and Bach have also been noted.

While little is now known about the circumstances of the original performance, the mass was familiar outside Vienna. Schubert received a letter from his brother Ferdinand on 6 October 1824, saying that he had been asked to play the organ for a performance of a mass in Hainburg. The mass was by a famous composer whose identity was unknown to the invitees; upon receiving it, Ferdinand recognised his brother's work.

Structure and scoring 
The mass consists of six movements. Performances require approximately 30 minutes.

In the following table of the movements, the markings, keys and time signatures are taken from the choral score, using the symbol for alla breve (2/2). The voices are abbreviated for the four-part choir (SATB), and the solo voices soprano (S), alto (A), tenor (T) and bass (B).

References

External links 

Masses by Franz Schubert
1815 compositions
Compositions in B-flat major